¡Alarma! may refer to:
¡Alarma! (album), an album by rock band Daniel Amos
¡Alarma! (magazine), a Mexican tabloid news-magazine
 "Alarma!", a single by German DJ act 666

See also
 Alarm (disambiguation)